Alen Jogan (born 24 August 1985) is a Slovenian former professional footballer who played as a defender.

Club career
Jogan started his senior career at ND Bilje in the Slovenian Third League, playing one match in the 2002–03 season. After joining ND Gorica, he had played for the team in the 2006–07 UEFA Champions League qualifying rounds, and the 2007–08 UEFA Cup.

In 2009 Jogan signed for Interblock from Ljubljana. In 2010, he crossed the border to Italy for Buttrio of Friuli region. After half season with the club in Eccellenza (Italian sixth division), Jogan re-joined Gorica in January 2011, where he signed a three-and-a-half year contract.

In June 2013, Jogan and Uroš Celcer joined Italian club Parma for undisclosed fees, with Solomon Enow moved to Slovenia for €1 million. On 1 July 2013, Jogan and Celcer returned to Gorica in temporary deals, along with eight Parma players, namely Bright Addae, Daniele Bazzoffia, Massimo Coda, Alex Cordaz, Sebestyén Ihrig-Farkas, Gianluca Lapadula, Floriano Vanzo and Fabio Lebran (Crotone/Parma). The paperwork was finalized on 19 July.

After the bankruptcy of Parma, Jogan was re-signed by Gorica.

References

External links
NZS profile 

1985 births
Living people
Slovenian footballers
Association football defenders
Slovenian PrvaLiga players
ND Gorica players
NK Brda players
NK IB 1975 Ljubljana players
Parma Calcio 1913 players
Slovenian expatriate footballers
Slovenian expatriate sportspeople in Italy
Expatriate footballers in Italy